The Pony Express is an American silent fiction film produced by Kalem Company and directed by Sidney Olcott with Sidney Olcott, Robert Vignola and Joe Santley in the leading roles. It was the first movie on Pony Express.

Cast
 Sidney Olcott
 Robert Vignola
 Joe Santley
 Fred Santley

References

External links
 AFI Catalog

 The Pony Express website dedicated to Sidney Olcott

1907 films
Silent American drama films
American silent short films
Films directed by Sidney Olcott
1907 short films
1907 drama films
American black-and-white films
1900s American films